Mike Ruchinski may refer to the following ice hockey players:

Mike Rucinski (ice hockey, born 1963)
Mike Rucinski (ice hockey, born 1975)